The Canadian Armed Forces (CAF; , FAC) are the unified military forces of Canada, including sea, land, and air elements referred to as the Royal Canadian Navy, Canadian Army, and Royal Canadian Air Force.

Personnel may belong to either the Regular Force or the Reserve Force, which has four sub-components: the Primary Reserve, Supplementary Reserve, Cadet Organizations Administration and Training Service, and the Canadian Rangers. Under the National Defence Act, the Canadian Armed Forces are an entity separate and distinct from the Department of National Defence (the federal government department responsible for the administration and formation of defence policy), which also exists as the civilian support system for the forces.

The Canadian Armed Forces are a professional volunteer force that consists of approximately 68,000 active personnel and  27,000 reserve personnel, with a sub-component of approximately 5,000 Canadian Rangers. The armed forces currently has over 3,000 personnel deployed overseas in multiple operations, such as Operation Snowgoose in Cyprus, Operation Unifier supporting Ukraine, Operation Caribbe in the Caribbean Sea, and Operation Impact as part of military intervention against ISIL.

The command-in-chief of the Canadian Armed Forces is constitutionally vested in the monarch, who is represented by the governor general (or the administrator). The professional head of the organization is the chief of the Defence Staff, who under the direction of the minister of national defence and together with the assistance of the Armed Forces Council, manages the operations of the Canadian Armed Forces. In 2021, Canada's military expenditure totalled approximately $26.4 billion, or around 1.3 percent of the country's gross domestic product (GDP).

History

Origins and establishment

Prior to Confederation in 1867, residents of the colonies in what is now Canada served as regular members of French and British forces and in local militia groups. The latter aided in the defence of their respective territories against attacks by other European powers, Indigenous peoples, and later American forces during the American Revolutionary War and War of 1812, as well as in the Fenian raids, Red River Rebellion, and North-West Rebellion. Consequently, the lineages of some Canadian Army units stretch back to the late 18th century, when militia units were formed to assist in the defence of British North America against invasion by the United States.

The responsibility for military command remained with the British Crown-in-Council, with a commander-in-chief for North America stationed in Halifax until the final withdrawal of British Army and Royal Navy units from the city in 1906. Thereafter, the Royal Canadian Navy was formed, and, with the advent of military aviation, the Royal Canadian Air Force. These forces were organized under the Department of Militia and Defence, and split into the Permanent and Non-Permanent Active Militiasfrequently shortened to simply The Militia. By 1923, the department was merged into the Department of National Defence.

The first significant overseas deployment of Canadian military forces occurred during the Second Boer War when several units were raised to serve under British command. Similarly, when the United Kingdom entered into conflict with Germany in the First World War, Canadian troops were called to participate in European theatres. Battles that are particularly notable to the Canadian military include the Second Battle of Ypres, the Battle of the Somme, the Battle of Vimy Ridge, the Second Battle of Passchendaele, as well as a series of attacks undertaken by the Canadian Corps during the Hundred Days Offensive.

During this period, a distinctly Canadian army and navy were established, followed by an air force, that, because of the constitutional arrangements at the time, remained effectively under the control of the British government until Canada gained legislative independence from the United Kingdom in 1931, in part due to the distinguished achievement and sacrifice of the Canadian Corps in the First World War. In November 1940, the Canadian militia was formally renamed the Canadian Army. However, in the 1950s, Reserve Army forces were once again referred to in official documentation as "Militia", which, although rare, is still used to refer to part-time members.

Canadian Forces entered the Second World War in September 1939, after the Canadian Crown-in-Council declared war on Nazi Germany. Battles and campaigns during the Second World War that was particularly notable to the Canadian military include the Battle of the Atlantic, the Battle of Britain, the Battle of Hong Kong, the Dieppe Raid, the invasion of Sicily and Italy, Operation Overlord, the Siegfried Line Campaign, Operation Veritable, as well as the strategic bombing of German cities.

At the end of the Second World War, Canada possessed the fourth-largest air force and fifth-largest naval surface fleet in the world. Conscription for overseas service was introduced only near the end of the war, and only 2,400 conscripts made it into battle. Originally, Canada was thought to have had the third-largest navy in the world, but with the fall of the Soviet Union, new data based on Japanese and Soviet sources found that to be incorrect.

Since 1947, Canadian military units have participated in more than 200 operations worldwide, and completed 72 international operations. Canadian soldiers, sailors, and aviators came to be considered world-class professionals through conspicuous service during these conflicts and the country's integral participation in NATO during the Korean War, First Gulf War, Kosovo War, and in United Nations Peacekeeping operations, such as the Suez Crisis, Golan Heights, Cyprus, Croatia, Bosnia, Afghanistan, and Libya. Canada maintained an aircraft carrier from 1957 to 1970 during the Cold War, which never saw combat but participated in patrols during the Cuban Missile Crisis.

Since unification

The current iteration of the Canadian Armed Forces dates from 1 February 1968, when the Royal Canadian Navy, Canadian Army, and Royal Canadian Air Force were merged into a unified structure and superseded by elemental commands, known as Air Command, Land Force, and Maritime Command. On 16 August 2011, the names for the three elemental commands were reverted to their historical predecessor, although the unified structure of the Canadian Armed Forces was maintained.

Deployment of Land Forces during this period has included NATO efforts in Europe, peacekeeping operations within United Nations-sanctioned conflicts and combat missions. The Canadian Forces deployed in Afghanistan until 2011, under the NATO-led United Nations International Security Assistance Force (ISAF), at the request of the Government of Afghanistan.

The Forces have also deployed domestically to provide aid during emergencies and natural disasters. Over 8,500 military personnel were sent to Manitoba after the 1997 Red River flood to help with evacuation, building dikes, and other flood-fighting efforts. The operation was considered a "public relations bonanza" for the military. The Forces were also deployed after the North American ice storm of 1998, with relief efforts beginning on January 8, after the provinces of New Brunswick, Ontario, and Quebec requested aid. Over 16,000 troops were deployed, making it the largest deployment of troops ever to serve on Canadian soil in response to a natural disaster, and the largest operational deployment of Canadian military personnel since the Korean War. The Forces were also deployed to British Columbia from August 3 to September 16, 2003, as a part of Operation Peregrine. The operation was conducted after the province was overwhelmed by 800 separate forest fires, and the provincial government requested federal aid. Over 2,200 soldiers were mobilized, and at its height, more than 2,600 military personnel participated in the 45-day operation.

Early 2000s modernization efforts
The Constitution of Canada gives the federal government exclusive responsibility for national defence, and expenditures are thus outlined in the federal budget. For the 2007–2010 fiscal year, the amount allocated for defence spending was CA$6.15 billion which is 1.4 percent of the country's GDP. This regular funding was augmented in 2005 with an additional CA$12.5 billion over five years, as well as a commitment to increasing regular force troop levels by 5,000 persons, and the primary reserve by 4,500 over the same period.

In 2008, the Government of Canada began efforts, through the "Canada First Defence Strategy", to modernize the Forces, through the purchase of new equipment, improved training and readiness, as well as the establishment of the Canadian Special Operations Regiment. More funds were also put towards recruitment, which had been dwindling throughout the 1980s and 1990s, possibly because the Canadian populace had come to perceive the Forces as peacekeepers rather than as soldiers, as shown in a 2008 survey conducted by the Department of National Defence. The poll found that nearly two-thirds of Canadians agreed with the country's participation in the invasion of Afghanistan, and that the military should be stronger, but also that the purpose of the forces should be different, such as more focused on responding to natural disasters. Then Chief of Defence Staff (CDS) Walter Natynczyk said later that year that, while recruiting has become more successful, the Forces was facing a problem with its rate of loss of existing members, which increased between 2006 and 2008 from 6% to 9.2% annually.

Renewal and re-equipment efforts have resulted in the acquisition of specific equipment (main battle tanks, artillery, unmanned air vehicles and other systems) to support the mission in Afghanistan. It has also encompassed initiatives to renew certain so-called "core capabilities" (such as the air force's medium-range transport aircraft fleet—the C-130 Hercules—and the army's truck and armoured vehicle fleets). In addition, new systems (such as C-17 Globemaster III strategic transport aircraft and CH-47 Chinook heavy-lift helicopters) have also been acquired for the Forces.

Role of women

In the 1950s, the recruitment of women was open to roles in medicine, communication, logistics, and administration. The roles of women in the CAF began to expand in 1971 after the department reviewed the recommendations of the Royal Commission on the Status of Women, at which time it lifted the ceiling of 1,500 women personnel, and gradually expanded employment opportunities into the non-traditional areas—vehicle drivers and mechanics, aircraft mechanics, air-traffic controllers, military police, and firefighters.

The department further reviewed personnel policies in 1978 and 1985, after Parliament passed the Canadian Human Rights Act and the Canadian Charter of Rights and Freedoms. As a result of these reviews, the department changed its policies to permit women to serve at sea in replenishment ships and a diving tender, with the army service battalions, in military police platoons and field ambulance units, and most air squadrons.

In 1987, occupations and units with the primary role of preparing for direct involvement in combat on the ground or at sea were still closed to women: infantry, armoured corps, field artillery, air defence artillery, signals, field engineers, and naval operations. On 5 February 1987, the minister of national defence created an office to study the impact of employing men and women in combat units. These trials were called Combat-Related Employment of Women.

All military occupations were open to women in 1989, except submarine service, which opened in 2000. Throughout the 1990s, the introduction of women into the combat arms increased the potential recruiting pool by about 100 percent. Women were fully integrated into all occupations and roles by the government of Jean Chrétien, and by 8 March 2000, even allowed to serve on submarines.

All equipment must be suitable for a mixed-gender force. Combat helmets, rucksacks, combat boots, and flak jackets are designed to ensure women have the same level of protection and comfort as their male colleagues. Women's uniforms are similar in design to men's uniforms, but conform to the female figure, and are functional and practical. Women are also provided with an annual financial entitlement for the purchase of bras.

In 2019, the National Post columnist Christie Blatchford reported, per an anonymous source, that the CAF had been fulfilling employment equity targets for internal job postings by secretly rejecting applications from white males, and by not requiring Indigenous candidates to either write or pass, the Canadian Forces Aptitude Test. However, Brigadier-General Virginia Tattersall (commander of military forces generation, including the Canadian Forces Recruiting Group [CFRG]) said, "There are no occupations that we restrict based on gender", though "diversity is a consideration" and near the end of the recruiting year, "We will look at diversity applicants first."

In March 2021, Lieutenant-Colonel Eleanor Taylor resigned citing sexual misconduct among the top brass. Since then, the CAF has been under pressure over allegations of sexual misconduct. Former justice Louise Arbour, who was tasked to lead a probe into military harassment and sexual misconduct claims in CAF in 2021, issued 48 recommendations to change the culture of the CAF. She said that she saw no basis for the CAF to retain the jurisdiction over sexual offences as it has not improved efficiency, discipline and morale.

Structure 

The Constitution Act, 1867 affirms that the commander-in-chief of the Canadian Armed Forces continues to be the country's sovereign, who, since 1904, has authorized his or her viceroy, the governor general, to exercise the duties ascribed to the post of commander-in-chief and to hold the associated title since 1905. All troop deployment and disposition orders, including declarations of war, fall within the royal prerogative and are issued as Orders in Council, which must be signed by either the monarch or governor general. Under the Westminster system's parliamentary customs and practices, however, the monarch and viceroy must generally follow the advice of his or her ministers in Cabinet, including the prime minister and minister of national defence, who are accountable to the elected House of Commons.

The Canadian Forces' 92,600 personnel are divided into a hierarchy of numerous ranks of officers and non-commissioned members. The governor general appoints, on the advice of the prime minister, the chief of the Defence Staff (CDS) as the highest-ranking commissioned officer in the Armed Forces and its commander. In this role, the CDS heads the Armed Forces Council, which also includes the vice chief of the Defence Staff and the commanders of the Royal Canadian Navy, Canadian Army, Royal Canadian Air Force, Canadian Joint Operations Command, Canadian Special Operations Forces Command, as well as certain other designated personnel. The Armed Forces Council generally operates from National Defence Headquarters (NDHQ) in Ottawa, Ontario. The sovereign and most other members of the Canadian Royal Family also act as colonels-in-chief, honorary air commodores, air commodores-in-chief, admirals, and captains-general of Canadian Forces units, though these positions are ceremonial.

The Canadian Forces operate out of 27 Canadian Forces bases (CFB) across the country, including NDHQ. This number has been gradually reduced since the 1970s with bases either being closed or merged. Both officers and non-commissioned members receive their basic training at the Canadian Forces Leadership and Recruit School in Saint-Jean-sur-Richelieu. Officers will generally either directly enter the Canadian Armed Forces with a degree from a civilian university or receive their commission upon graduation from the Royal Military College of Canada. Specific element and trade training is conducted at a variety of institutions throughout Canada, and to a lesser extent, the world.

As of 2013, the Canadian Forces have 68,000 Regular Force members and 27,000 reservists, bringing the total force to approximately 95,000. These individuals serve on numerous Canadian Forces bases located in all regions of the country and are governed by the Queen's Regulations and Orders and the National Defence Act.

Royal Canadian Navy

The Royal Canadian Navy (RCN), headed by the commander of the Royal Canadian Navy, includes 28 warships and submarines deployed in two fleets: Maritime Forces Pacific (MARPAC) at CFB Esquimalt on the west coast, and Maritime Forces Atlantic (MARLANT) at  Majesty's Canadian Dockyard in Halifax on the east coast, as well as one formation: the Naval Reserve Headquarters (NAVRESHQ) at Quebec City, Quebec. The fleet is augmented by various aircraft and supply vessels. The RCN participates in NATO exercises and operations, and ships are deployed all over the world in support of multinational deployments.

Canadian Army

The Canadian Army is headed by the commander of the Canadian Army and is administered through four divisions—the 2nd Canadian Division, the 3rd Canadian Division, the 4th Canadian Division and the 5th Canadian Division—the Canadian Army Doctrine and Training System and the Canadian Army Headquarters.

Currently, the Regular Force component of the Army consists of three field-ready brigade groups: 1 Canadian Mechanized Brigade Group, at CFB Edmonton and CFB Shilo; 2 Canadian Mechanized Brigade Group, at CFB Petawawa and CFB Gagetown; and 5 Canadian Mechanized Brigade Group, at CFB Valcartier and Quebec City. Each contains one regiment of artillery, armour, and combat engineers, three battalions of infantry (all scaled in the British fashion), one battalion for logistics, a squadron for headquarters/signals, and several smaller support organizations. A tactical helicopter squadron and a field ambulance are co-located with each brigade but do not form part of the brigade's command structure.

The 2nd, 3rd and 4th Canadian Divisions each have a Regular Force brigade group, and each division except the 1st has two to three Reserve Force brigades groups. In total, there are ten Reserve Force brigade groups. The 5th Canadian Division and the 2nd Canadian Division each have two Reserve Force brigade groups, while the 4th Canadian Division and the 3rd Canadian Division each have three Reserve Force brigade groups. Major training and support establishments exist at CFB Gagetown, CFB Montreal and CFB Wainwright.

Royal Canadian Air Force

The Royal Canadian Air Force (RCAF) is headed by the commander of the Royal Canadian Air Force. The commander of 1 Canadian Air Division and Canadian NORAD Region, based in Winnipeg, is responsible for the operational command and control of Air Force activities throughout Canada and worldwide. 1 Canadian Air Division operations are carried out through eleven wings located across Canada. The commander of 2 Canadian Air Division is responsible for training and support functions. 2 Canadian Air Division operations are carried out at two wings. 3 Canadian Space Division is responsible for delivering space power effects in support of Canadian Armed Forces operations, including space domain awareness, space-based support of military operations, and defending and protecting military space capabilities. Wings represent the grouping of various squadrons, both operational and support, under a single tactical commander reporting to the operational commander and vary in size from several hundred personnel to several thousand.

Major air bases are located in British Columbia, Alberta, Saskatchewan, Manitoba, Ontario, Quebec, Nova Scotia, and Newfoundland and Labrador, while administrative and command and control facilities are located in Winnipeg and North Bay. A Canadian component of the NATO Airborne Early Warning Force is also based at NATO Air Base Geilenkirchen near Geilenkirchen, Germany.

The RCAF and Joint Task Force (North) (JTFN) also maintain at various points throughout Canada's northern region a chain of forward operating locations, each capable of supporting fighter operations. Elements of CF-18 squadrons periodically deploy to these airports for short training exercises or Arctic sovereignty patrols.

Canadian Joint Operations Command

The Canadian Joint Operations Command is an operational element established in October 2012 with the merger of Canada Command, the Canadian Expeditionary Force Command and the Canadian Operational Support Command. The new command, created as a response to the cost-cutting measures in the 2012 federal budget, combines the resources, roles and responsibilities of the three former commands under a single headquarters.

Canadian Special Operations Forces Command

The Canadian Special Operations Forces Command (CANSOFCOM) is a formation capable of operating independently but primarily focused on generating special operations forces (SOF) elements to support CJOC. The command includes Joint Task Force 2 (JTF2), the Canadian Joint Incident Response Unit (CJIRU) based at CFB Trenton, as well as the Canadian Special Operations Regiment (CSOR) and 427 Special Operations Aviation Squadron (SOAS) based at CFB Petawawa.

Information Management Group
Among other things, the Information Management Group is responsible for the conduct of electronic warfare and the protection of the Armed Forces' communications and computer networks. Within the group, this operational role is fulfilled by the Canadian Forces Information Operations Group, headquartered at CFS Leitrim in Ottawa, which operates the following units: the Canadian Forces Information Operations Group Headquarters (CFIOGHQ), the Canadian Forces Electronic Warfare Centre (CFEWC), the Canadian Forces Network Operations Centre (CFNOC), the Canadian Forces Signals Intelligence Operations Centre (CFSOC), the Canadian Forces Station (CFS) Leitrim, and the 764 Communications Squadron. In June 2011 the Canadian Armed Forces Chief of Force Development announced the establishment of a new organization, the Directorate of Cybernetics, headed by a Brigadier-General, the Director General Cyber (DG Cyber). Within that directorate, the newly established CAF Cyber Task Force has been tasked to design and build cyber warfare capabilities for the Canadian Armed Forces.

Royal Canadian Medical Service
The Royal Canadian Medical Service is a personnel branch of the CAF, consisting of all members of medical occupations.

Royal Canadian Dental Corps
The Royal Canadian Dental Corps is a personnel branch of the CAF.

Canadian Forces Health Services Group

The Health Services Group is a joint formation that includes over 120 general or specialized units and detachments providing health services to the Canadian Armed Forces. With few exceptions, all elements are under command of the Commander, who may also be appointed Surgeon General when the position is filled by a medical officer, for domestic support and force generation, or temporarily assigned under command of a deployed Joint Task Force through Canadian Joint Operations Command.

Canadian Armed Forces Reserve Force

The Canadian Armed Forces have a total reserve force of approximately 50,000 primary and supplementary that can be called upon in times of national emergency or threat. For the components and sub-components of the Canadian Armed Forces Reserve Force, the order of precedence follows:
(1) Primary Reserve (26,000),
(2) Supplementary Reserve (11,000) Prior to 2002 this consisted of:
 (a) Supplementary Ready Reserve, and
 (b) Supplementary Holding Reserve,
after 2002 there is no sub-division of the Supplementary Reserve.
(3) Cadet Organizations Administration and Training Service (7,500), and
(4) Canadian Rangers (5,000).

Primary Reserve

Approximately 26,000 soldiers, sailors, and airmen, trained to the level of and interchangeable with their Regular Force counterparts, and posted to CAF operations or duties on a casual or ongoing basis, make up the Primary Reserve. This group is represented, though not commanded, at NDHQ by the chief of Reserves and Employer Support, who is usually a major-general or rear-admiral, and is divided into four components that are each operationally and administratively responsible to its corresponding environmental command in the Regular Force—the Naval Reserve (NAVRES), Land Force Reserve (LFR), and Air Reserve (AIRRES)—in addition to one force that does not fall under an environmental command, the Health Services Reserve under the Canadian Forces Health Services Group.

Cadet Organizations Administration and Training Service
The Cadet Organizations Administration and Training Service (COATS) consists of officers and non-commissioned members who conduct training, safety, supervision and administration of nearly 60,000 cadets aged 12 to 18 years in the Canadian Cadet Organization. The majority of members in COATS are officers of the Cadet Instructors Cadre (CIC) branch of the CAF. Members of the Reserve Force Sub-Component COATS who are not employed part-time (Class A) or full-time (Class B) may be held on the "Cadet Instructor Supplementary Staff List" (CISS List) in anticipation of employment in the same manner as other reservists are held as members of the Supplementary Reserve.

Canadian Rangers
The Canadian Rangers, who provide surveillance and patrol services in Canada's arctic and other remote areas, are an essential reserve force component used for Canada's exercise of sovereignty over its northern territory.

Defence policy 
Since the Second World War, Canadian defence policy has consistently stressed three overarching objectives:
 The defence of Canada itself;
 The defence of North America in co-operation with US forces;
 Contributing to broader international security.

During the Cold War, a principal focus of Canadian defence policy was contributing to the security of Europe in the face of the Soviet military threat. Toward that end, Canadian ground and air forces were based in Europe from the early 1950s until the early 1990s.

However, since the end of the Cold War, as the North Atlantic Treaty Organization (NATO) has moved much of its defence focus "out of area", the Canadian military has also become more deeply engaged in international security operations in various other parts of the world—most notably in Afghanistan from 2002 to 2014.

The basis for current Canadian defence capability objectives was originally set in the Canada First Defence Strategy, introduced by the former Harper Government in 2008 but is now updated through the Liberal Government's 2017 defence strategy, Strong, Secure and Engaged (SSE). The SSE pledged greater funding to support the Canadian military (particularly in relation to the National Shipbuilding Procurement Strategy) in its primary tasks related to the defence of Canada, the defence of North America and contributing to global security.

In addition to its core missions, the Canadian Armed Forces also contribute to the conduct of Canadian defence diplomacy through a range of activities, including the deployment of Canadian Defence Attachés, participation in bilateral and multilateral military forums (e.g. the System of Cooperation Among the American Air Forces), ship and aircraft visits, military training and cooperation, and other such outreach and relationship-building efforts.

Military expenditures
The Constitution of Canada gives the federal government exclusive responsibility for national defence, and expenditures are thus outlined in the federal budget. For the 2016–17 fiscal year, the amount allocated for defence spending was billion. The estimated expenditure in 2021 was billion. In April 2022, the government announced in its budget that it intends to increase defence spending by billion over the next five years.

The federal government now factors in military-related spending from departments such as Veterans Affairs, Public Works, and the Treasury Board when calculating "defence spending". It is believed that this move was made to improve Canada's defence-related NATO reporting metrics.

Ranks

Uniforms

Although the Canadian Armed Forces are a single service, there are three similar but distinctive environmental uniforms (DEUs): navy blue (which is actually black) for the navy, rifle green for the army, and light blue for the air force. CAF members in operational occupations generally wear the DEU to which their occupation "belongs." CAF members in non-operational occupations (the "purple" trades) are allocated a uniform according to the "distribution" of their branch within the CAF, the association of the branch with one of the former services, and the individual's initial preference. Therefore, on any given day, in any given CAF unit, all three coloured uniforms may be seen.

The uniforms of the CAF are sub-divided into five orders of dress:
 Ceremonial dress, including regimental full dress, patrol dress, naval "high-collar" whites, and service-dress uniforms with ceremonial accoutrements such as swords, white web belts, gloves, etc.
 Mess dress, which ranges from full mess kit with mess jacket, cummerbund, or waistcoat, etc., to service dress with bow tie
 Service dress, also called a walking-out or duty uniform, is the military equivalent of the business suit, with an optional white summer uniform for naval CF members
 Operational dress, an originally specialized uniform for wear in an operational environment, is now for everyday wear on base or in garrison
 Occupational dress, which is specialized uniform articles for particular occupations (e.g., medical, dental, firefighter)

Only service dress is suitable for CAF members to wear on any occasion, barring "dirty work" or combat. With gloves, swords, and medals (No. 1 or 1A), it is suitable for ceremonial occasions and "dressed down" (No. 3 or lower), it is suitable for daily wear. Generally, after the elimination of base dress (although still defined for the Air Force uniform), the operational dress is now the daily uniform worn by most members of the CF, unless service dress is prescribed (such as at the NDHQ, on parades, at public events, etc.). Approved parkas are authorized for winter wear in cold climates and a light casual jacket is also authorized for cooler days. 

Units of the Canadian Army, Royal Canadian Air Force, and cadets of the Royal Military College of Canada also wear full-dress uniforms. The Army's universal full-dress uniforms includes a scarlet tunic, midnight blue trousers with a scarlet trouser stripe. However, many regiments in the Canadian Army maintain authorized regimental differences from the Army's universal full dress, most notably for its armoured units, Scottish regiments, and Voltigeur/Rifle regiments. The full-dress uniform for cadets at Royal Military College is similar to the Army's universal full dress uniform. Full dress uniforms for units of the Royal Canadian Air Force include a blue tunic, and blue trousers and facings. Naval full dress includes a navy blue tunic and trousers with white facings, although the Canadian Forces dress instructions state that naval full dress is no longer worn.

Authorized headdresses for the Canadian Armed Forces is the: beret, wedge cap, ballcap, Yukon cap, and tuque (toque). Each is coloured according to the distinctive uniform worn: navy (white or navy blue), army (rifle green or "regimental" colour), and air force (light blue). Adherents of the Sikh faith may wear uniform turbans (dastar) (or patka, when operational) and Muslim women may wear uniform tucked hijabs under their authorized headdress. Jews may wear yarmulke under their authorized headdress and when bareheaded. The beret is probably the most widely worn headgear and is worn with almost all orders of dress (with the exception of the more formal orders of Navy and Air Force dress), and the colour of which is determined by the wearer's environment, branch, or mission. Naval personnel, however, seldom wear berets, preferring either service caps or authorized ballcaps (shipboard operational dress), which only the Navy wear. Air Force personnel, particularly officers, prefer the wedge cap to any other form of headdress. There is no naval variant of the wedge cap. The Yukon cap and tuque are worn only with winter dress, although clearance and combat divers may wear tuques year-round as a watch cap. Soldiers in Highland, Scottish, and Irish regiments generally wear an alternative headdress, including the glengarry, balmoral, tam o'shanter, and caubeen instead of the beret. The officer cadets of both Royal Military Colleges wear gold-braided "pillbox" (cavalry) caps with their ceremonial dress and have a unique fur "Astrakhan" for winter wear. The Canadian Army wears the CG634 helmet.

Relationship with the Crown 

The Canadian Forces have derived many of their traditions and symbols from the military, navy and air force of the United Kingdom, including those with royal elements. Contemporary icons and rituals, however, have evolved to include elements reflective of Canada and the Canadian monarchy. Members of the country's royal family also continue their two-century-old practice of maintaining personal relationships with the forces' divisions and regiments, around which the military has developed complex protocols. The role of the Canadian Crown in the Canadian Forces is established through both constitutional and statutory law; the National Defence Act states that "the Canadian Forces are the armed forces of Her Majesty raised by Canada", and the Constitution Act, 1867, vests Command-in-Chief of those forces in the sovereign.

All honours in Canada emanate from the country's monarch, who is regarded as the fount of honour. A complex system of orders, decorations, and medals by which Canadians are honoured has evolved. The Victoria Cross, Order of Military Merit, Cross of Valour, Star of Courage, Medal of Bravery are some of the military awards that have been created for Canadians serving in a military capacity. The Victoria Cross has been presented to 94 Canadians and 2 Newfoundlanders between its creation in 1856 and 1993, when the Canadian Victoria Cross was instituted. However, no Canadian has received either honour since 1945.

During the unification of the forces in the 1960s, a renaming of the branches took place, resulting in the "royal designations" of the navy and air force being abandoned. On August 16, 2011, the Government of Canada announced that Air Command was re-assuming the air force's original historic name, Royal Canadian Air Force, Land Force Command was re-assuming the name Canadian Army, and Maritime Command was re-assuming the name Royal Canadian Navy. The change was made to better reflect Canada's military heritage and align Canada with other Commonwealth realms whose militaries use the royal designation.

See also

Notes

References

Further reading

Beaudet, Normand (1993). Le Mythe de la défense canadienne. Montréal: Éditions Écosociété. 

Rennick, Joanne Benham (2013). "Canadian Values and Military Operations in the Twenty-First Century," Armed Forces & Society 39, No. 3, pp. 511–30
Leuprecht, Christian & Sokolsky, Joel. (2014). Defense Policy "Walmart Style" Canadian Lessons in "not so grand" Grand Strategy. Armed Forces & Society Journal Online First.
 
 
Faces of War at Library and Archives Canada

External links

 
 Combat Camera – Official CF photo website
 Canadian Military Documentary channel on YouTube

 
Department of National Defence (Canada)
Military education and training in Canada
Uniformed services of Canada